Scatterwood Lake is a natural lake in South Dakota, in the United States.

Scatterwood Lake was descriptively named by John C. Frémont and Joseph Nicollet.

See also
List of lakes in South Dakota

References

Lakes of South Dakota
Bodies of water of Faulk County, South Dakota